Ajan or Aján is a surname. Notable people with the surname include:

 Syed Ajan, Afghan Guantanamo Bay detainee
 Tamás Aján (born 1939), Hungarian International Weightlifting Federation president and International Olympic Committee member

Fictional characters
 Matilda Ajan, character in the anime series Mobile Suit Gundam